Keith Ripley (29 March 1935 – 5 November 2012) was an English professional footballer, who played as a wing half.

During his career, Ripley played for Leeds United, Norwich City, Peterborough United, Mansfield Town and Doncaster Rovers. He died in November 2012 aged 77, following a long illness.

References

1935 births
2012 deaths
Sportspeople from Normanton, West Yorkshire
English footballers
Association football wing halves
Leeds United F.C. players
Norwich City F.C. players
Peterborough United F.C. players
Mansfield Town F.C. players
Doncaster Rovers F.C. players
English Football League players